Mihai Butucaru (born 29 January 1958) is a Romanian sailor. He competed in the Finn event at the 1980 Summer Olympics.

References

External links
 

1958 births
Living people
Romanian male sailors (sport)
Olympic sailors of Romania
Sailors at the 1980 Summer Olympics – Finn
Place of birth missing (living people)